Prince William Henry of Nassau-Usingen (born 2 May 1684 in 's-Hertogenbosch; died: 14 February 1718 in Usingen) was from 1702 to 1718 Prince of Nassau-Usingen.

Parents 
William Henry was the son of Prince Walrad of Nassau-Usingen and his wife, Catherine Françoise, comtesse de Croÿ-Roeulx

Marriage and issue 
William Henry married on 15 April 1706 Charlotte Amalia (1680–1738), a daughter of Henry, Prince of Nassau-Dillenburg.  They had nine children; five children died within the first year: Henry (1708–1708), Amélie (1709–1709), William (1710–1710), Louis (1714–1714) and Johanna (1715–1716).  Four children reached adulthood:

 Françoise (1707–1750)
 Charles, Prince of Nassau-Usingen (1712–1775)
 Hedwig (1714–1786)
 William Henry, prince of Nassau-Saarbrücken (1718–1768)

After his death in 1718 was succeeded by his underage son Charles as Prince of Nassau-Usingen. Charlotte Amalie, reigned as regent until Charles came of age.

Legacy 
In 1707, William Henry founded the village of Wilhemsdorf, which was named after him. It was annexed by neighbouring Usingen in 1972.

Military career 
Like his father, William Henry had a career in the Dutch army.  In 1691, he became a captain.  From 1701 to 1707, he was colonel of the Walloon Regiment.  He was wounded in the Battle of Ekeren on 30 June 1703.

Princes of Nassau
House of Nassau
1684 births
1718 deaths
18th-century German people
Military personnel of the Holy Roman Empire